Edward Holmead Harte (December 5, 1922 – May 18, 2011) was an American newspaper executive, journalist, philanthropist, and conservationist. The son of Houston Harte, co-founder of the Harte-Hanks newspaper conglomerate, he had a decades long relationship with that organization. For Harte-Hanks he was an executive and journalist with various newspapers, including The Snyder Daily News, The San Angelo Standard-Times, and The Corpus Christi Caller-Times. He also served as vice chairman of Harte-Hanks from 1962 to 1987. As a philanthropist he donated tens of millions of dollars to a variety of charities and institutions. He was also a pioneer in environmental conservationism in Texas, notably spearheading successful land conservation campaigns on Padre Island and Mustang Island. In 2002 the National Audubon Society (NAS) awarded him the Audubon Medal.

Early life and education
Born in Pilot Grove, Missouri, Edward H. Harte came from a newspaper family. His great grandfather was a Washington correspondent for the New York Tribune and his father, Houston Harte, co-founded the Harte-Hanks newspaper conglomerate. He grew up in Depression-era San Angelo, Texas where his father was publisher of The San Angelo Standard-Times.

During World War II Harte served in the United States Army. After the war he entered Dartmouth College from which he earned a bachelor's degree. After graduating, he became a reporter for The Claremont Eagle in New Hampshire. He left that position to become a reporter for The Kansas City Star.  He then partnered with his brother, Houston H. Harte, and Bernard Hanks’s son-in-law, Stormy Shelton, in buying the weekly Snyder, Texas newspaper The Snyder Daily News. That publication became part of the Harte-Hanks newspaper chain.

Work for Harte-Hanks
Harte worked for the Harte-Hanks corporation in a variety of capacities throughout his career. As a teenager he had his first job working as a switchboard operator at The San Angelo Standard-Times, one of the many newspapers owned by the Harte-Hanks corporation. He later served as president of The San Angelo Standard-Times from 1952 to 1956. From 1962 until his retirement in 1987 he was vice chairman of Harte-Hanks and publisher of The Corpus Christi Caller-Times. In addition to serving as The Caller-Times''' publisher he also wrote a longstanding Sunday column for the paper that covered Mexican politics and current events. His column was known for providing coverage in this area which was not available elsewhere in the mainstream press. He continued to write thate column even after his retirement as publisher in 1987.

Conservationist and philanthropist
While running The Caller-Times, Harte further developed a passion for nature which ultimately led to his becoming an activist for environmental conservation. He regularly visited the Aransas National Wildlife Refuge where he met and befriended several members of the board of the NAS. In 1964 he joined the NAS board himself on which he served for a total of 13 years. He was notably President of the NAS board from 1974 to 1979. Under his leadership The Caller-Times became an important advocate for land preservation and environmental protection in what The New York Times'' described as "an unusual stance for a Texas newspaper at the time". In 1962 Harte successfully spearheaded a campaign to designate  of Padre Island as a national seashore; a feat which resulted in the protection of the longest stretch of undeveloped barrier island in the world. In the early 1970s he led another successful campaign to designate 3,954-acres of Mustang Island as a state park. In 1985 he and his brother donated their 66,000-acre ranch bordering the Big Bend National Park to The Nature Conservancy, which in turn donated the land to the Big Bend National Park in 1989.

In addition to his work as a conservationist, Harte was also a philanthropist. He donated a known 70 million dollars to local Corpus Christi organizations and institutions like universities, colleges, research labs, and environmental groups. It is likely that his philanthropy extended considerably beyond this amount as he often gave anonymous donations to charities and organizations for decades. Some of contributions included a 3.5 million dollar donation towards a new performing arts center at Texas A&M University–Corpus Christi (TAMU-CC), $1.8 million for a library in Flour Bluff, and a $1 million challenge grant to Corpus Christi Metro Ministries which helped save two homeless shelters from closing. In 2000 he established the Harte Research Institute for Gulf of Mexico Studies at TAMU–CC, with a $46 million endowment. The Institute has since played a major role in helping cleanup of the Deepwater Horizon oil spill.

Personal life
In 1947 Harte married Janet Frey with whom he had two sons, Christopher and William Harte, and 2 daughters, Elizabeth Owens and Julia Widdowson. His 52-year marriage ended upon his wife's death in 1999. He died 12 years later in 2011 at his retirement home in Scarborough, Maine at the age of 88.

References

1922 births
2011 deaths
People from Cooper County, Missouri
People from San Angelo, Texas
American male journalists
American newspaper executives
20th-century American newspaper publishers (people)
Harte family (United States)
Dartmouth College alumni
United States Army personnel of World War II